Higuaín is a Basque surname. Notable people with the surname include:

Jorge Higuaín, an Argentine central defender, father of Federico and Gonzalo Higuain
Gonzalo Higuaín, a striker for Inter Miami, Jorge Higuain's son and Federico's younger brother
Federico Higuaín, a striker for D.C. United, Jorge Higuain's son and Gonzalo's older brother

Higuain